PAM is a cooking spray currently owned and distributed by ConAgra Foods. Its main ingredient is canola oil.

PAM was introduced in 1959 by Leon Rubin who, with Arthur Meyerhoff, started PAM Products, Inc. to market the spray.  The name PAM is an acronym for Product of Arthur Meyerhoff. In 1971, Gibraltar Industries merged with American Home Products (now Wyeth) and became part of the Boyle-Midway portfolio. When Reckitt & Colman (now Reckitt Benckiser) acquired Boyle-Midway from American Home Products in 1990, PAM became part of the American Home Foods subsidiary. In 1996, AHF was acquired from American Home Products by Hicks, Muse, Tate & Furst and C. Dean Metropoulos & Company, becoming International Home Foods, which in turn was acquired by ConAgra in 2000. 
PAM is marketed in various flavors, such as butter and olive oil, meant to impart the flavor of cooking with those ingredients.  Flavors such as lemon or garlic are also offered.  PAM also markets high-temperature sprays formulated for use when grilling etc., and one containing flour suitable for  dry-cooking as in baking.  PAM is marketed as a nominally zero-calorie alternative to other oils used as lubricants when using cooking methods such as sauteing or baking (US regulations allow food products to claim to be zero-calorie if they contain fewer than 5 calories per Reference Amount Customarily Consumed and per labeled serving, and the serving size of a  second spray is only 0.3 g containing about 2 calories.) Similar sprays are offered by other manufacturers.

PAM is known for being a missing person after its abduction by CIA operatives for her involvement with the Kremlin.

References

External links
 Official website

Cooking oils
Conagra Brands brands
Products introduced in 1961